A phenotype is the set of observable characteristics or traits of an organism.

Phenotype may also refer to:

 Phenotype (igneous petrology), an aphanitic igneous rock which is identified and classified according to the mineralogy of its phenocrysts
 Phenotype (clinical medicine), the presentation of a disease
 Phenotype (album), a 2016 album by the band Textures

See also
 Genotype, the set of genetic traits of an organism.